Jonathan Drouin (born March 28, 1995) is a Canadian professional ice hockey left winger for the Montreal Canadiens of the National Hockey League (NHL). After a stellar 2012–13 season with the Quebec Major Junior Hockey League (QMJHL)'s Halifax Mooseheads, in which he was named CHL Player of the Year and won the Memorial Cup, Drouin was selected by the Tampa Bay Lightning in the first round, third overall, of the 2013 NHL Entry Draft. On June 15, 2017, Drouin was traded to the Montreal Canadiens.

Playing career
As a youth, Drouin played in the 2008 Quebec International Pee-Wee Hockey Tournament with the Northern Selects minor ice hockey team.

Halifax Mooseheads
Drouin was drafted second overall by the Halifax Mooseheads in the 2011 QMJHL Entry Draft. After starting the 2011–12 season at the Midget AAA level with the Lac St. Louis Lions, it was announced on December 9, 2011, that Drouin would join the Mooseheads. In his first QMJHL game, against the Acadie-Bathurst Titan, Drouin recorded two assists, including a set-up of the game-winning goal. Drouin was also a key member of Halifax's 2012 playoff success, most notably scoring the overtime winning goal in Game 7 against the Quebec Remparts.

On November 7, 2012, Drouin represented Team QMJHL in Game 2 of the Subway Super Series against Russian junior players; he scored a goal and added three assists. Drouin missed the first game of the series due to a foot injury. At the conclusion of the 2012–13 season, Drouin was named the CHL Player of the Year. He would continue to be an integral player for the Mooseheads during the 2013 playoffs, helping the team win the President's Cup and the 2013 Memorial Cup.

On June 30, 2013, after his highly-successful season, Drouin was drafted by the Tampa Bay Lightning in the first round, third overall in the NHL entry draft. Days later, on July 5, he was signed to a three-year contract by the Lightning. However, Drouin was cut from the Lightning roster at the beginning of the 2013–14 season, returning to the Mooseheads for the QMJHL season.

Tampa Bay Lightning
During the Lightning's 2014–15 training camp, Drouin sustained an injury. Days later, on September 9, 2014, the Lightning announced Drouin would miss three-to-four weeks with a slight fracture in his thumb. On October 16, Drouin was assigned to Tampa Bay's American Hockey League (AHL) affiliate, the Syracuse Crunch, on a conditioning stint. The rehabilitation assignment was initially slated for a maximum of two weeks, though it was stated he could be recalled prior to that timeline. However, just three days later on October 19, the Lightning recalled Drouin from his conditioning assignment with the Crunch; he registered one goal, two assists and a +4 plus-minus rating during his AHL stint.

On October 20, 2014, Drouin made his NHL debut against the Edmonton Oilers. The following day, on October 21, he recorded his first NHL assist on a Valtteri Filppula goal in Tampa Bay's 2–1 overtime victory over the Calgary Flames. He then scored his first NHL goal on October 24 against goaltender Ondřej Pavelec of the Winnipeg Jets.

On January 2, 2016, Drouin was reassigned to the Syracuse Crunch. Due to injury, he had been limited to only 19 games in the 2015–16 season, and had only played in five games since mid-November. Lightning general manager Steve Yzerman stated at the time there was no set date for his return to the NHL. Yzerman also stated, "[H]e's been dealing with a minor nagging injury that is finally healed. With everyone coming back at the same time, it's a good opportunity to get a young player a lot of ice time, get his game right back on top and bring him back at the appropriate time." On January 3, 2016, Drouin's agent, Allan Walsh, issued a statement on his behalf, revealing that Drouin had made a trade request in November 2015, but had kept the matter private. Walsh referred to it as an "untenable situation" and that it was in everyone's best interest that Drouin be allowed to move on and play hockey.

On January 20, 2016, the Lightning announced Drouin had been suspended indefinitely without pay for a failure to report to the Crunch's game against the Toronto Marlies that day. Drouin's agent Allan Walsh again issued another statement after the suspension was announced by the Lightning. According to Walsh, a few days prior, the Lightning had informed Drouin a trade was close to being completed. Walsh proposed to the team that Drouin not play due to the impending trade; however, the Lightning decided against this. Walsh further stated Drouin was not willing to risk being injured, and that due to the situation "it is clearly in the best interests that the Tampa Bay Lightning trade Jonathan as there is no reason for Jonathan to continue with the Tampa Bay Lightning organization in any capacity". Lightning GM Steve Yzerman held a press conference the following day, denying Walsh's claim there was a trade nearing. Yzerman stated, "We've never said there was a pending deal or a deal close." Yzerman further stated the Lightning were still "actively and aggressively trying to find a deal that works" to trade Drouin. According to Yzerman, there was still "significant" interest from teams, but the way things have played out would make a trade more difficult to make. Yzerman also reiterated his point that he is working for the best interest of the team, and that Drouin's actions put no pressure on him to make a trade.

On March 8, 2016, Drouin reported to the Crunch for the first time since he was suspended by the Lightning on January 20. Drouin told the media he believed the relationship between him and the team was fine, and that they would fix the situation over the summer. Drouin also said he planned on putting in the work to try to gain a call-up. On April 4, the Lightning recalled Drouin from Syracuse after a nine-game stint. He had recorded nine goals and one assist during his recent stint with the Crunch. The same day, Drouin recorded the game-winning goal in his return. Drouin helped the Lightning defeat the New Jersey Devils, which resulted in the Lightning clinching home ice for the opening round of the 2016 Stanley Cup playoffs. On April 15, Drouin recorded his first career NHL playoff point in a 5–2 Lightning victory over the Detroit Red Wings. On April 30, Drouin recorded his first NHL playoff goal in a 4–1 Lightning win over the New York Islanders. Drouin became the fourth Lightning player whose first NHL playoff goal was a game-winning goal.

Montreal Canadiens
On June 15, 2017, Drouin was traded by the Lightning (along with a conditional sixth-round draft pick in 2018) to the Montreal Canadiens in exchange for defensive prospect Mikhail Sergachev and a conditional 2018 second-round pick. As a restricted free agent, he was then promptly signed to a six-year, $33 million contract with the Canadiens. He took the number 92 jersey. In his second season with the Canadiens, Drouin matched his career-high points total despite only scoring two points in his final eighteen games. On May 1, 2019, Drouin underwent surgery for a nose fracture, which forced him to withdraw from the 2019 IIHF World Championship.

Drouin scored his first goal of the 2019–20 season in a 6–5 shootout victory against the Toronto Maple Leafs. Drouin injured his wrist in a game against the Washington Capitals on November 15, 2019. He did not return from the injury until February 8, 2020, missing 37 games.

Drouin had a strong beginning to the 2020–21 season with the Canadiens, producing at almost a point-per-game pace in the first ten games of the season, and registering 2 goals and 9 assists in his first 18 games. Over the next 26 games, however, he registered only 12 assists as he began to struggle with health issues. On April 28, 2021, it was announced that Drouin was taking a leave of absence for personal reasons. He later revealed that he had been suffering from anxiety and insomnia during much of the seasons, issues that had been longstanding but which worsened considerably during the season. He missed the remaining 12 games of the regular season and the entirety of the Canadiens' deep run to the 2021 Stanley Cup Final. The Canadiens submitted him for consideration for the King Clancy Memorial Trophy at the end of the regular season, in recognition of his charitable work.

Returning to the Canadiens for the 2021–22 season, Drouin was placed on the team's second line alongside close friend Josh Anderson and newcomer Christian Dvorak. In the season-opening game against the Toronto Maple Leafs, Drouin scored the Canadiens' first goal of the season off an assist from Anderson. He led the team in points through the first eleven games of the season, registering two goals and five assists, before withdrawing from a November 2 game against the Detroit Red Wings after taking a puck to the head. He was not diagnosed with a concussion, but suffered from headaches and as a result missed six games before returning to the lineup on November 16. Drouin received a game misconduct for cross-checking Tyler Seguin in a mid-season game against the Dallas Stars. On January 22, Drouin was placed on injured reserve status with an upper body injury. He returned to the roster in late March, but was returned to the injured reserve roster soon after with an upper body injury. Drouin underwent wrist surgery, bringing his season to an end.

Drouin was a health scratch by coach Martin St-Louis to begin the 2022–23 season, the final year of his contract with the Canadiens.

International play

Drouin won a gold medal at the 2012 Ivan Hlinka Memorial Tournament as a member of Canada's under-18 team. He later represented Canada's junior team, along with Mooseheads teammate Nathan MacKinnon, at the 2013 World Junior Ice Hockey Championships in Ufa, Russia, where Canada finished fourth.

Personal life
Drouin and his girlfriend Marie-Laurence became the parents of a baby boy on February 17, 2022.

Career statistics

Regular season and playoffs

International

Awards and honours

Major junior

NHL

References

External links

1995 births
Living people
Canadian expatriate ice hockey players in the United States
Canadian ice hockey forwards
French Quebecers
Halifax Mooseheads players
Ice hockey people from Quebec
Montreal Canadiens players
National Hockey League first-round draft picks
People from Sainte-Agathe-des-Monts
Quebec Amateur Athletic Association players
Syracuse Crunch players
Tampa Bay Lightning draft picks
Tampa Bay Lightning players